Lü Wei may refer to:

Lü Wei (diver) (1966–1990), Chinese diver
Lü Wei (footballer) (born 1989), Chinese male footballer
Lü Wei (softball) (born 1983), Chinese female softball player